The 1999-2000 Azerbaijan Top League was contested by twelve clubs and won by FK Shamkir.

Teams

Stadia and locations

1Qarabağ played their home matches at Surakhani Stadium in Baku before moving to their current stadium on 3 May 2009.

League table

Results

Season statistics

Top scorers

References

External links
Azerbaijan 1999-2000 RSSSF
APL Stats

Azerbaijan Premier League seasons
Azer
1999–2000 in Azerbaijani football